Aphilanthops is a genus of ant queen kidnapping wasps in the family Crabronidae. There are at least four described species in Aphilanthops.

Species
These four species belong to the genus Aphilanthops:
 Aphilanthops foxi Dunning, 1898
 Aphilanthops frigidus (F. Smith, 1856)
 Aphilanthops hispidus W. Fox, 1894
 Aphilanthops subfrigidus Dunning, 1898

References

Crabronidae
Articles created by Qbugbot